The 1922 Philadelphia Athletics season involved the A's finishing seventh in the American League with a record of 65 wins and 89 losses. It was the first season since they won the 1914 pennant that the Athletics did not finish in last place.

Offseason 
Ben Shibe, who had been part-owner of the Athletics since 1901, died on January 14, 1922. His eldest son, Tom Shibe, was named club president. Tom and his brother, John, would handle the business side of the club, while Connie Mack would continue to be in full charge of the baseball side.

Regular season

Season standings

Record vs. opponents

Roster

Player stats

Batting

Starters by position 
Note: Pos = Position; G = Games played; AB = At bats; H = Hits; Avg. = Batting average; HR = Home runs; RBI = Runs batted in

Other batters 
Note: G = Games played; AB = At bats; H = Hits; Avg. = Batting average; HR = Home runs; RBI = Runs batted in

Pitching

Starting pitchers 
Note: G = Games pitched; IP = Innings pitched; W = Wins; L = Losses; ERA = Earned run average; SO = Strikeouts

Other pitchers 
Note: G = Games pitched; IP = Innings pitched; W = Wins; L = Losses; ERA = Earned run average; SO = Strikeouts

Relief pitchers 
Note: G = Games pitched; W = Wins; L = Losses; SV = Saves; ERA = Earned run average; SO = Strikeouts

External links
1922 Philadelphia Athletics team page at Baseball Reference
1922 Philadelphia Athletics team page at www.baseball-almanac.com

Oakland Athletics seasons
Philadelphia Athletics season
Oakland